The Durham Wildcats are an English basketball club based in Newton Aycliffe, County Durham. The original incarnation were members of the British Basketball League, the top-level competition in the United Kingdom, and played their home games at the Newton Aycliffe Leisure Centre. Established in 2005, the club enjoyed a rapid rise through the British basketball system with successive promotions, before applying to join the top-tier British Basketball League in 2011. The club completed four seasons in the BBL, but withdrew following the 2014-15 season. The newly reformed Wildcats re-entered the English Basketball League in 2020.

Franchise history
In 2001, the merger of the Belmont Basketball Club and a group of U16 players from Belmont School resulted in a club that competed in the Durham County Local League playing with teams in the 1st and 3rd divisions. In 2005 Wildcats founded the team that would begin life in the EBL Division 3 North. The Wildcats achieved their first promotion four years later, finishing top of a highly competitive EBL Division 3 North, and gaining promotion to EBL Division 2.

In 2010, the Wildcats won their first national silverware beating Westminster Warriors in the Patron's Cup final (96-70) at the Crystal Palace National Sports Centre. The club went on to win the league title with an 18-2 record, gaining promotion to EBL Division 1, and beat Team Northumbria (70-67) in the Playoff final at the Amaechi Basketball Centre to complete the Division 2 treble. The Wildcats had a mixed inaugural season in Division 1, unable to emulate the success of the previous few seasons. A 7-11 record gave them a 7th-place finish, as well as early exits in the National Cup and post-season Playoffs.

After weeks of rumours, it was officially announced that the Wildcats would enter the British Basketball League following the withdrawal of Worthing Thunder.

After four seasons in the BBL, in July 2015 it was announced that the Wildcats would not be participating in the 2015-16 BBL season. The team had previously recruited players from Durham University, however following changes to visa regulations players called up to the team on international student visas were found to be ineligible to play. The team sought to re-structure and join the league at a later date.

Home arenas

Spennymoor Leisure Centre (2005-2007 and 2009)
Newton Aycliffe Leisure Centre (2007-2015)
Durham University Sport and Wellbeing Park (2020-present)

Season-by-season records

Trophies
EBL Division 2:
Winners: 2009/10
EBL Division 3 North:
Winners: 2008/09
EBL Division 2 Play-offs:
Winners: 2009/10
Patron's Cup:
Winners: 2009/10

Players

Final roster

References

External links
Official Durham Wildcats website
Durham Wildcats on Facebook
Durham Wildcats on Twitter

Basketball teams in England
British Basketball League teams
Newton Aycliffe
Sport in County Durham
Basketball teams established in 2005
Basketball teams disestablished in 2015
Basketball teams established in 2020
2015 disestablishments in England
2005 establishments in England
2020 establishments in England
Sport in Durham, England
Spennymoor